Julio Alberto Pérez Cuapio (born July 30, 1977, in Tlaxcala) is a former Mexican racing cyclist who rode for  between 2000 and 2008. He is best known for his stage wins in the Giro d'Italia. In 2001, he won on the Passo Pordoi ahead of Gilberto Simoni. In 2002, he also won in San Giacomo and in Corvara.

Palmarès

2000
1st Trofeo dello Scalatore
2nd Overall Tour de Langkawi
1st  Mountains classification
1st Stage 10
2001
1st Stage 13 Giro d'Italia
2002
Giro d'Italia
1st  Mountains classification
1st Stages 13 & 16
2nd Overall Giro del Trentino
2003
1st  Overall Settimana Ciclistica Lombarda
1st Mountains classification
1st Stage 2
2004
6th Overall Brixia Tour
1st Mountains classification
1st Stage 2a
2005
1st  Overall Giro del Trentino
5th Overall Settimana Ciclista Lombarda
2008
4th Overall Vuelta a Costa Rica
1st Stage 14
2009
5th Overall Vuelta a Guatemala
9th Overall Vuelta Ciclista Chiapas
2010
8th Overall Vuelta Mexico Telmex

External links

Mexican male cyclists
1977 births
Living people
Sportspeople from Tlaxcala
Mexican Giro d'Italia stage winners
20th-century Mexican people
21st-century Mexican people